Ross Diercks (born May 3, 1957) was a Democratic member of the Wyoming House of Representatives, representing the 2nd district from 1992 to 2011.

External links
Wyoming State Legislature - Representative Ross Diercks official WY Senate website
Project Vote Smart - Representative Ross Diercks (WY) profile
Follow the Money - Ross Diercks
2006 2004 2002 2000 1998 1996 1994 campaign contributions

Democratic Party members of the Wyoming House of Representatives
1957 births
Living people
People from Lusk, Wyoming
People from Washakie County, Wyoming